Kool (stylized as KOOL) is an American brand of menthol cigarette, currently owned and manufactured by ITG Brands LLC, a subsidiary of Imperial Tobacco Company. Kool cigarettes sold outside of the United States are manufactured by British American Tobacco.

History 
Launched in 1933 by Brown and Williamson as an unfiltered 70-millimeter "regular" cigarette. Kool enjoyed continued success through the 1950s. A 1953 Roper survey showed that two percent of white Americans and five percent of African Americans preferred the Kool brand.

Growing public concern about the health risks associated with smoking prompted Brown and Williamson responded to release filtered varieties of Kool: an 85-millimeter "king-sized" version in the 1960s, followed by a 100-millimeter or "long" version in the 1970s. The 1980s saw the introduction of Kool lights and a loss of market share to other menthol brands, such as Newport.

In 2003, Brown and Williamson purchased the R.J. Reynolds Tobacco Company, making Kool a Reynolds brand. The iconic green and white pack, virtually unchanged for some seventy years, was overhauled, and the original unfiltered Kool cigarette was discontinued. These changes did little to boost sales.

In 2015 a merger between Reynolds American and the Lorillard Tobacco Company brought the Kool brand into the Imperial Tobacco Company portfolio of properties.

Marketing 

Kool cigarette advertising began with the character of "Willie" the penguin, who was portrayed as several different professions, among which were a doctor, a soldier and a chef. In the early 1950s, the company placed a number of decal signs at entrance doors reading "Come in... it's Kool inside",  indicating that the space was air-conditioned.

In the early 1960s, the image of the cartoon penguin was no longer used, and Kool instead began marketing their cigarettes by linking the taste of menthol to outdoor scenes portraying water or snow. Elaine Devry and John Clarke (actor) featured in Kool's advertisement at this time, as the female smoker whose day was improved by a passer-by who changed her car's flat tire. This was decades before whistleblower Jeffrey Wigand exposed Brown and Williamson's deliberate lacing of their tobacco with harmful substances.

In 1971, Kool initiated an advertising campaign where consumers could mail order a Snark sailboat with the Kool logo on the sail—for $88 (later $99) along with one Kool carton flap—including delivery.  The sailboats retailed at the time for $120.  As one of Kool's highest scoring ads, the company received over 18,000 orders for "Sea Snarks" in 1971.

During the 1970s and 1980s, Kool sponsored jazz festivals and many advertisements from the era featured a musician or an actor, playing a saxophone. Also, Kool was notoriously targeted to African-Americans, as were many menthol cigarettes.
In 1975, Kool held a sweepstakes with a Rolls-Royce Corniche as the prize.

Sport sponsorship 
Kool was the main sponsor of Team KOOL Green in the CART series from the 1997 season until the 2002 season. In 2002, after the Tobacco Master Settlement Agreement passed, Kool cigarettes could not be displayed on the cars for the IRL's Indianapolis 500, and the logo was replaced with 7-Eleven.

Markets 
Kool cigarettes are mainly sold in the United States, but also were or still are sold in Canada, Honduras, Antigua, Bahamas, Jamaica, Chile, Colombia, Argentina, Germany, France, Switzerland, Spain, Japan and Australia. The Estonian Patent Office denied permission for the Kool trademark to be used in Estonia because the name means "school" in the Estonian language.

Current varieties 
Kool is available in the following styles in the United States:
 Green - Filter Kings & Super Longs (formerly Full Flavor)
 Blue - Filter Kings & Super Longs (100s) (formerly Milds)
Previously, Kool XL, a wider cigarette, was available.

Notes

References

External links 
 
 Gallery of classic graphic design featuring Kool cigarettes

Imperial Brands brands
Products introduced in 1933